Look to the Rainbow is a 1966 album by Astrud Gilberto, arranged by Gil Evans and Al Cohn.

Track listing

Side One
"Berimbau" (Ray Gilbert, Baden Powell, Vinicius De Moraes) – 2:31
"Once Upon a Summertime" (Johnny Mercer, Michel Legrand, Eddie Barclay, Eddy Marnay) – 2:30
"Felicidade" (Antônio Carlos Jobim) – 2:41
"I Will Wait for You" (LeGrand, Norman Gimbel) – 4:42
"Frevo" (Jobim) – 2:20
Side Two
 "Maria Quiet" (Maria Moite) – 1:50
 "Look to the Rainbow" (Burton Lane, E.Y. "Yip" Harburg) – 3:20
 "Bim Bom" (João Gilberto) – 1:50
 "Lugar Bonito" (Carlos Lyra, Gimbel) – 3:15
 "Eu Preciso Aprender a Ser só (Learn to Live Alone)" (Marcos Valle, Ray Gilbert) – 3:15
 "She's a Carioca" (Jobim) – 2:22

Arranged by Gil Evans, except Side Two, tracks 4 and 5, arranged by Al Cohn.

Personnel
Dom Um Romão – Berimbau (Side One, track 1)
Johnny Coles – trumpet solo (Side One, track 4)

References

1966 albums
Astrud Gilberto albums
Verve Records albums
Albums produced by Creed Taylor
Albums arranged by Gil Evans
Portuguese-language albums
Albums recorded at Van Gelder Studio